Consulate General of the Republic of Indonesia in New York is a consular mission of Indonesia in New York City, United States. The consulate general provides consular services to 15 U.S. states, mainly on the East Coast of the United States: Connecticut, Delaware, Maine, Maryland, Massachusetts, New Hampshire, New Jersey, New York, North Carolina, Pennsylvania, Rhode Island, South Carolina, Vermont, Virginia, and West Virginia.

The consular office was opened in 1951 and was originally located in Rockefeller Center. In May 1965, the office moved to its current address on 5 East 68th Street at the Upper East Side.

List of consuls general 
The following are Indonesian diplomats that served as Consul General in New York:

 R. Achmad Natanegara, 1953–
 Kwee Djie Hoo, 1957–1960
 R. Soesanto Djojosoegito, 1960
 R. Tjahjana Natadiningrat, 1964–
 Jusuf Ramh,  1969
 Trihardjo, 1976–
 M. Daoed Gade, 1979–
 Rudy Lengkong, 1983–
 Janus Jozef Pitoy, 1987–
 Arkelaus Ngantung Pantow, 1990–
 Is Isnaedi, 1994–
 I Gusti Ngurah Swetja, 1999–
 Kristio Wahyono,  2004
 Trie Edi Mulyani, 2007–2010
 Ghafur Akbar Dharmaputra, 2012–
 Abdul Kadir Jaelani, 2016–2019
 Arifi Saiman, 2019–Incumbent

See also 

 Indonesia–United States relations
 Embassy of Indonesia, Washington, D.C.
 Consulate General of Indonesia, Chicago
 Consulate General of Indonesia, Houston
 Consulate General of Indonesia, Los Angeles
 Consulate General of Indonesia, San Francisco
 List of diplomatic missions of Indonesia

References

External links 
 
 
 

New York
Indonesia
Indonesia–United States relations